Loyal Percival Oakley (20 November 1898 – 4 July 1990) was an Australian rules footballer who played with Richmond in the Victorian Football League (VFL). He was recruited from Sydney club Paddington but was originally from Tasmania.

Notes

External links 

1898 births
Australian rules footballers from Tasmania
Richmond Football Club players
Lefroy Football Club players
Paddington Australian Football Club players
1990 deaths